Activate (formerly Bloglovin') is a platform that allows users to read, organize and discover their favorite blogs on mobile and desktop. It is a design-focused platform that aggregates feeds from sources with RSS feeds, allowing users to discover and organize content. As of April 2014, Bloglovin reached over 16 million global users monthly. Bloglovin caters primarily to the “lifestyle” crowd. 90% of Bloglovin's users are female.

History

Founding and early years 

Bloglovin' was founded in a garage in Täby, Sweden in 2007 by Dan Carlberg, Daniel Swenson, Patrik Ring, Mattias Swenson, and Daniel Gren. Launched as “Blogkoll” (Swedish for “to keep track of blogs”), the initial goal of Bloglovin’ was to help fashion followers keep track of blogs without having to open up multiple tabs on their browsers. Bloglovin’ eventually developed into a platform that allows users to consume, organize, and discover the Internet's disaggregated content.

In October 2011, Bloglovin' registered its 1 millionth user.

Funding and growth

2012 

In 2012, Bloglovin' raised $1 million in Series A funding from investors including Betaworks, Lerer Ventures, RRE Ventures, Hank P. Vigil & Fritz Lanman, Eric Martineau-Fortin, Rob Wiesenthal, Jill Greenthal, and Investment AB Kinnevik.

2013 

In January 2013, Bloglovin' moved their headquarters to New York. The company continues to have an office in Stockholm, Sweden.
Bloglovin' experienced a significant growth in signups following the demise of Google Reader. In May 2013, the site launched a major redesign, which included changes allowing users to curate content.
In September 2013, The Next Web included Bloglovin' on its list of "50 New York City Startup You Need to Know About."

2014 

In February 2014, Joy Marcus, formerly a Managing Director at Gotham Ventures was appointed chief executive officer of Bloglovin’. Marcus is an “industry veteran” with “experience in the media and technology industry and a proven track record launching and growing companies.” Prior to joining Gotham Ventures, Marcus held senior executive positions at Time Warner (AOL) and Barnes&Noble.com, and spent the early years of her career launching MTV in several countries, including Russia and South Africa.

In April 2014, Bloglovin raised $7 million in Series A funding. Investor Northzone led the round, and the founders of Babble and SoulCycle invested personally in the site. Additionally, Bloglovin' received further investment from previous funders Betaworks, Lerer Ventures, While Star Capital, and Bassett Investment Group. According to CEO Marcus, this investment will primarily be used to “recruit engineering talent.”  
Christian Hernandez (WhiteStar), Bruce Jaffe (Glam Media), Paul Murphy (Betaworks, Dots), and Pär-Jörgen Pärson (Northzone) sit on the board of Bloglovin'.

Name Change and CEO 
In April 2018, the company rebranded as Activate and replaced former Bloglovin' CEO Giordano Contestabile with Kamiu Lee, formerly Bloglovin's vice president of strategy and business development. The platform launched Activate Studio at the same time. The company's decision to rebrand came shortly after Northzone made significant investments in the platform.

Android and iOS Apps 

Activate also offers apps for both Android and iOS platforms.

Bloglovin' Awards 

The Bloglovin' Awards, held annually since 2011, are an annual awards night during New York Fashion Week hosted by Bloglovin' honoring bloggers in various categories.

Bloglovin' Awards categories & nominees 2012 

Arizona Newcomer of the Year
 Olivia Palermo
 Tuula Vintage
 Wendy's Lookbook
 I SPY DIY
 Honestly WTF

Tibi Inspiration Award
 The Coveteur
 Le Fashion
  The Vogue Weekend
 Textbook
 Into the Gloss

Fashion Traffic Blogger Business of the Year
 Elin Kling - Nowhere
 Tavi - RookieMag
 Jennine - Independent Fashion Bloggers
 Chiara Ferragni, Andy Torres, and Carolina Engman - Werelse
 Purseblog

Best Personal Style Blog
 Fashion Toast
 Sea of Shoes
 Atlantic Pacific
 The Man Repeller
 The Glamourai

Best International Blog
 Garotas Estupidas
 Ena Matsumoto
  Kenza Zouiten
 Momoko Ogihara
 Lovelypepa

Best Fashion News Blog
 Refinery29
 Fashionista
 Who, What, Wear
 Women's Wear Daily
 Stylecaster

Best Street Style Blog
 Stockholm Street Style
 Scott Schuman
 Street Peeper
 Jak & Jil
 Streetfsn

Most Original Blog
 Bryan Boy
 Susie Bubble
 Julia Frakes
 Anna dello Russo
 From Me to You

Blogger of the Year
 The Man Repeller

Bloglovin Awards categories & nominees 2011 

Newcomer of the Year
 The Blonde Salad
 Natalie Off Duty
 Into the Gloss
 Oracle Fox
 Christeric

Best Personal Style Blog
 Fashion Toast
 The Glamourai
 Sea of Shoes
 Cupcakes and Cashmere
 Karla's Closet

Best Fashion News Blog
 Refinery29
 theCut
 Fashionista
 Who What Wear
 Fashionologie

Best Street Style Blog
 Jak & Jill
 The Sartorialist
 Garance Dore'
 Face Hunter
 Streetpeper

Most Original Blog
 Bryan Boy
 Gala Darling
 Bunny Bisous
 The Man Repeller
 Style Bubble

Blogger of the Year
 Fashion Toast

References 

Web browsers